Ignacy Tokarczuk (1 February 1918 – 29 December 2012) was a Polish prelate of the Roman Catholic Church.

Biography
Tokarczuk was born in Łubianki Wyższe near Tarnopol.  He was ordained a priest by Bishop Eugeniusz Baziak in Lvov on 21 June 1942.  On 2 December 1965 he was appointed a Bishop of the Diocese of Przemyśl, and was consecrated by Cardinal Stefan Wyszyński on 6 February 1966.  On 2 June 1991 Tokarczuk was bestowed a personal title of archbishop by John Paul II.  On 25 March 1992 he became a metropolitan Archbishop of Przemyśl.  As the Bishop of Przemysl, he was known for building a great number of churches in his diocese despite the lack of having permission to build from the communist authorities.  It is said that he has erected nearly 430 churches during his tenure as a bishop.  He was also a great supporter of the Solidarity movement.  For his uncompromising stance in the defense of the institution of the Catholic Church in the People's Republic of Poland, he was repeatedly harassed by the Polish Security Service. Tokarczuk retired from the Archdiocese of Przemyśl on 17 April 1993 and was succeeded by Archbishop Józef Michalik.

Tokarczuk was also a recipient of the Order of White Eagle, and from 2007 to 2009, he was a member of the Grand Chapter of the Order.

See also
 Archdiocese of Przemyśl

References

External links
 Catholic-Hierarchy
 Przemyśl Diocese  

1918 births
2012 deaths
Bishops of Przemyśl
20th-century Roman Catholic bishops in Poland
John Paul II Catholic University of Lublin alumni
Academic staff of the John Paul II Catholic University of Lublin
Recipients of the Order of the White Eagle (Poland)